Mazzucchi is a surname. Notable people with the surname include:

Alfredo Mazzucchi (1878-1972), Italian composer and musician
Andrea Mazzucchi (born 1966), Italian American entrepreneur, network architect, and computer specialist
Massimiliano Mazzucchi (born 1980), Italian diver